Okanagan—Similkameen was a federal electoral district in British Columbia, Canada, that was represented in the House of Commons of Canada from 1979 to 1988.

The riding was created in 1976 from parts of Fraser Valley East, Kamloops—Cariboo and Okanagan Boundary ridings.

It consisted of:
 the Regional District of Okanagan-Similkameen
 part of the Regional District of Central Okanagan lying west of the westerly boundaries of Electoral Area A and Electoral Area I
 part of the Regional District of Kootenay Boundary lying west of the westerly boundary of Electoral Area B
 part of the Thompson-Nicola Regional District lying east of the easterly boundary of Electoral Area I and south of the southerly boundaries of Electoral Area J and Electoral Area L.

Members of Parliament

Election results

See also 

 List of Canadian federal electoral districts
 Past Canadian electoral districts

External links 

 Website of the Parliament of Canada
  Riding history from the Library of Parliament

Former federal electoral districts of British Columbia